Reinhold O. Carlson (September 20, 1905 – July 7, 2006) was an American politician from the state of Iowa.

Biography
Carlson was born to Swedish immigrants in Des Moines, Iowa and attended public schools in Des Moines. He then attended Drake University, Augustana College, and the University of Nebraska. He was a savings and loan executive. Carlson served as Mayor of Des Moines from 1960 to 1962, and on the Des Moines City Council since 1958. He was later elected to the Iowa State Senate, serving the 29th district from 1971 to 1973 as a Republican. He died in Polk County, Iowa at the age of 100.

References

1905 births
2006 deaths
American centenarians
Men centenarians
American people of Swedish descent
Iowa Republicans
Politicians from Des Moines, Iowa
Mayors of Des Moines, Iowa